Polanowo may refer to the following places in Poland:
Polanowo, Lower Silesian Voivodeship (south-west Poland)
Polanowo, Piła County in Greater Poland Voivodeship (west-central Poland)
Polanowo, Słupca County in Greater Poland Voivodeship (west-central Poland)